The COVID-19 pandemic in the British Indian Ocean Territory is part of the ongoing worldwide pandemic of coronavirus disease 2019 caused by severe acute respiratory syndrome coronavirus 2. The virus was confirmed to have reached Diego Garcia of the British Indian Ocean Territory in November 2020.

Background 
On 12 January 2020, the World Health Organization (WHO) confirmed that a novel coronavirus was the cause of a respiratory illness in a cluster of people in Wuhan City, Hubei Province, China, which was reported to the WHO on 31 December 2019.

The case fatality ratio for COVID-19 has been much lower than SARS of 2003, but the transmission has been significantly greater, with a significant total death toll. From 19 March 2020, Public Health England no longer classified COVID-19 as a "High consequence infectious disease".

Timeline

November 2020
In November 2020, the first case of COVID-19 was confirmed at Diego Garcia.

December 2020 
In December 2020, the second case, a close contact of the first case, was confirmed.

May 2021 
In May 2021, three more cases were confirmed from a flight. The personnel arrived at the island in April.

References

British Indian Ocean Territory
British Indian Ocean Territory
British Indian Ocean Territory